On 9 February 2015, hooded gunmen in the French city of Marseille sparked a lockdown after they fired Kalashnikov rifles at police officers while Manuel Valls, the French Prime Minister, was visiting the city. It is thought that the shooting was drug-gang related, but due to the recent Charlie Hebdo shooting and the Porte de Vincennes hostage crisis during the 2015 Île-de-France attacks, the entire troubled Marseille suburb of La Castellane was on lockdown for hours. No one was injured.

Incident
Shortly after gunfire occurred near a police car, the National Gendarmerie Intervention Group locked down the area. A number of arrests were made, resulting in the seizure of seven Kalashnikovs, two .357 Magnum revolvers and around 20 kilograms of drugs. However, it soon became clear that the gunmen were not aiming at the police; instead, the gunfire was the result of a turf war between two gangs, selling primarily cannabis and cocaine. Drug-traffickers as a whole in La Castellane are reported to make between 50,000 and 60,000 euros a day as of 2015.

Aftermath
Shortly after the shooting, Manuel Valls called it an example of "apartheid", whereby some French citizens who live in such neighbourhoods feel excluded from society.

References

2015 crimes in France
2015 shooting
2015 shooting
February 2015 crimes in Europe
Organized crime events in France
Violent non-state actor incidents in Europe